Cnemaspis kumpoli, also known commonly as Kumpol's rock gecko or the Trang Province gecko, is a species of gecko, a lizard in the family Gekkonidae. The species is endemic to the Malay peninsula.

Etymology
The specific name, kumpoli, is in honor of Nai Kumpol Isarankura, who was Curator of Zoological Specimens at Chulalongkorn University in Bangkok, Thailand.

Geographic range
C. kumpoli is found in West Malaysia (Perlis, Selangor) and southern Thailand (Satun, Songkhla, Trang).

Reproduction
C. kumpoli is oviparous.

References

Further reading
Grismer LL (2011). Lizards of Peninsular Malaysia, Singapore and their Adjacent Archipelagos. Frankfurt am Main: Edition Chimaira. 728 pp. .
Taylor EH (1963). "The Lizards of Thailand". Univ. Kansas Sci. Bull. 44: 687–1077. (Cnemaspis kumpoli, new species, pp. 746–749, Figure 12).
Ulber T, Schäfer C (1986). "Beobachtungen in Biotop von Cnemaspis kumpoli Taylor, 1963 mit einer Wiederbeschreibung der Art [=Observations on the biotope of Cnemaspis kumpoli Taylor, 1963 with a redescription of the species]". Sauria 8 (4): 27–30. (in German).

kumpoli
Reptiles described in 1963